Ji-man Choi (Hangul: 최지만; Hanja: 崔志萬; ; born May 19, 1991) is a South Korean professional baseball player for the Pittsburgh Pirates of Major League Baseball (MLB). Choi is capable of playing at the designated hitter, first baseman, and outfielder positions. He has previously played in MLB for the Los Angeles Angels, New York Yankees, Milwaukee Brewers, and Tampa Bay Rays. Choi was also a member of Korea's U12 and U18 national baseball teams.

Career

Seattle Mariners
Choi signed with the Seattle Mariners before the 2010 season. He was sent to their AZL affiliate to begin his professional baseball career. With the Arizona League Mariners, Choi batted .378 with 23 runs scored, 51 hits, 15 doubles, two triples, one home run, 23 runs batted in (RBIs), and 10 stolen bases in 39 games played. Amongst league batters, Choi was second in on-base percentage (.459), and slugging percentage (.541). Choi also played 11 games with the Class A-Advanced High Desert Mavericks of the California League that season. On August 24, in a game against the Inland Empire 66ers, Choi hit his first and only home run with the Mavericks. With the Mavericks, he batted .302 with seven runs scored, 13 hits, one double, one triple, one home run, and seven RBIs. Combined between the two teams, Choi batted .360 with 30 runs scored, 64 hits, 16 doubles, three triples, two home runs, and 30 RBIs in 50 games played. On defense between the two clubs, he played 34 games as a first baseman and 10 as a catcher, committing two errors; and making 39 assists, and 326 putouts. After the season, he was named the Arizona League Most Valuable Player. The Seattle Mariners named Choi as their top position player on their Arizona League affiliate.

Choi played for the Jackson Generals of the Class AA Southern League in 2013. He was named to the World Team roster of the All-Star Futures Game. Choi was added to the Mariners 40-man roster on November 20, 2013. On April 17, 2014, Choi was suspended for 50 games after testing positive for methandienone.

Choi sustained a fractured fibula in the first game of Mariners' spring training in 2015, as he leaped at first base to try to save an errant throw from farmhand Tyler Smith at shortstop. The next day, he was designated for assignment when the Mariners re-added left-hander Edgar Olmos.

Baltimore Orioles
Choi signed a minor league contract with the Baltimore Orioles in November 2015.

Los Angeles Angels

Choi was selected by the Los Angeles Angels of Anaheim in the 2015 Rule 5 draft. Choi made the Angels' Opening Day roster, and he made his major league debut on April 5. The Angels designated him for assignment on May 11. On May 15, Choi cleared waivers and accepted an outright to the Salt Lake Bees of the Class AAA Pacific Coast League, thus remaining with the Angels. Choi returned to the majors on July 9 in place of injured C. J. Cron. Choi hit his first career major league home run off Texas Rangers starter A. J. Griffin at Angel Stadium of Anaheim on July 19, 2016. On December 23, 2016, Choi was designated for assignment.

New York Yankees
Choi signed a minor league contract with the New York Yankees, receiving a non-roster invitation to spring training. At the end of spring training he was assigned to the Scranton/Wilkes-Barre RailRiders of the Class AAA International League.

The Yankees promoted Choi to the major leagues on July 4, 2017. In his first game with the Yankees, he hit a  two-run home run. He was designated for assignment on July 19, 2017, and assigned outright to the Triple-A Scranton/Wilkes-Barre RailRiders on July 23, 2017.

Milwaukee Brewers
On January 15, 2018, Choi signed a minor league deal with the Milwaukee Brewers. His contract was purchased by the Brewers on March 28, 2018, and he was assigned to the Opening Day roster. After assignment to the Brewers AAA minor league team, Choi was recalled on May 18, 2018, to the Brewers active roster. He homered in his first at-bat as designated hitter against the Minnesota Twins.

On June 9, 2018, Choi hit his first career grand slam as a pinch-hitter in the sixth inning of a Brewers-Phillies game. It was the Milwaukee Brewers' first grand slam of 2018.

Tampa Bay Rays
One day after his grand slam with the Brewers, Choi was traded to the Tampa Bay Rays for infielder Brad Miller and cash considerations. He was immediately optioned to AAA Durham. The Rays promoted Choi to the major leagues on July 11, 2018. On September 10, he hit a walk-off two-run homer against Brad Hand of the Cleveland Indians. In 49 games for the Rays, Choi hit .269 with 8 home runs and 27 RBIs.

In 2019, Choi played in 127 games, hitting .261 with 19 home runs and 63 RBI. On September 24, Choi hit a 12th-inning walk-off home run against the Yankees. In the postseason, he had 3 hits in 23 at-bats, recording one solo home run. The Rays were defeated by the Houston Astros in the Division Series. In his first full year with the Rays, Choi established himself as a fan favorite due to his performance and attitude on the field.

On July 26, 2020, Choi made his first appearance as a switch hitter in his career, batting right-handed twice against left-handed Toronto Blue Jays pitcher Anthony Kay. In his second appearance against Kay, he hit a home run. Choi ended the year batting .230/.331/.410 with 3 home runs in 42 games. In game one of the American League Division Series against the New York Yankees, he hit a two-run home run against Gerrit Cole. This was his third home run against Cole in 2020, improving his career numbers to 10-for-19 with four home runs against him. In Game 2 of the 2020 World Series, Choi singled to right field, becoming the first Korean player to record a hit in the World Series.

Choi played in 83 games for the Rays in 2021, batting .229/.348/.411 with 11 home runs and 45 RBIs. On November 30, 2021, Choi signed a $3.2 million contract with the Rays, avoiding salary arbitration.

Pittsburgh Pirates
On November 10, 2022, Choi was traded to the Pittsburgh Pirates in exchange for pitcher Jack Hartman.

References

External links

1991 births
Living people
Major League Baseball players from South Korea
Major League Baseball left fielders
Major League Baseball first basemen
Baseball players suspended for drug offenses
Los Angeles Angels players
New York Yankees players
Milwaukee Brewers players
Tampa Bay Rays players
Arizona League Mariners players
Clinton LumberKings players
High Desert Mavericks players
Adelaide Bite players
Jackson Generals (Southern League) players
Tacoma Rainiers players
Tigres de Aragua players
South Korean expatriate baseball players in Venezuela
Estrellas Orientales players
Salt Lake Bees players
Scranton/Wilkes-Barre RailRiders players
Colorado Springs Sky Sox players
Durham Bulls players
Sportspeople from Incheon
South Korean expatriate baseball players in Australia
South Korean expatriate baseball players in the United States
South Korean expatriate sportspeople in Venezuela
South Korean expatriate baseball players in the Dominican Republic